Captain Abhimanyu Singh Sindhu (born 18 December 1967) is an Indian politician. He was cabinet minister with independent charge of eight departments in the Government of Haryana state in India in the first-ever government led by the Bharatiya Janata Party (BJP) in Haryana.

He is a former soldier, award-winning newspaper founder editor, entrepreneur, educationist and philanthropist. He was BJP's Member of the Legislative Assembly (MLA) in Legislative Assembly of Haryana from Narnaund in Hisar district from 2014 to 2019.

He served in the Indian Army for six years where he was decorated with Special Services Medal. He was then selected for the Civil Services of India (ICS) but chose not to join in favour of philanthropic and social service work.

As a trustee and/or chairman of various family-owned not-for-profit foundations, such as Param Mitra Manav Nirman Sansthan and Indus Group of Institutions of Sindhu Education Foundation, which owns more than dozen private colleges and schools in Haryana and Chhattisgarh.

Sindhu holds or has held several prominent BJP party positions including as National Spokesperson, National General Secretary,  General Secretary in Haryana, in-charge of Punjab state, and co-in-charge of the state of Uttar Pradesh campaign during the Indian General Election, 2014.

In 2014, he won the election for the position of Member of the Legislative Assembly (MLA) as the BJP candidate from Narnaund in Haryana Vidhan Sabha constituency.

Life and works

Early life and education
Abhimanyu Singh Sindhu was born on 18 December 1967 at Khanda Kheri village, Hisar district, Haryana, India. Sindhu earned a Bachelor of Commerce degree from the Maharishi Dayanand University, Rohtak, in 1986. He obtained a LLB from the Maharishi Dayanand University in 2005 and has also completed a postgraduate diploma in Mass Communication from the Guru Jambheshwar University of Science and Technology, Hisar, which was awarded in 2007. He had also completed two years executive education course from Harvard Business School in 2015.

Career

In 1987, Sindhu joined the Indian Army, passing-out as a Second Lieutenant on 5 March 1988 to serve in 7 Mechanised Infantry Regiment (1 Dogra).
In 1994, he was selected for the Indian Administrative Service but he chose not to join, preferring instead to concentrate on philanthropic and social service work.

Sindhu was also involved in business prior to his entry into politics. He is variously the founder-owner, director and chairman of several companies, including Sindhu Tradelinks Pvt Ltd and Indus Portfolio Pvt Ltd. His business ventures include coal mining, power generation, transport, share broking, finance and portfolio management, education and media.
Sindhu is editor-in-chief of the Hindi-language daily Hari Bhoomi newspaper that is distributed in Haryana, Chhattisgarh, Madhya Pradesh and parts of Delhi and Odisha. In 2012, this was the 11th-largest Hindi daily newspaper in India by readership. In 2002, he received the Babu Bal Mukund Gupt Award from the Haryana Sahitya Akademi for his work in journalism.

Politics
In 2004, Sindhu lost contest for the Rohtak Lok Sabha parliamentary constituency against Bhupinder Singh Hooda, the then state Indian National Congress president. In the following year, he failed to win in a by-election for the same constituency against Hooda's son, Deepender Singh Hooda, and also lost the Legislative Assembly of Haryana contest in the Narnaund constituency.

In 2005, Sindhu was appointed as the General Secretary of Haryana BJP unit for two terms before being escalated to BJP National Secretary.

In 2009, he contested and lost the election for the position of MLA in the Legislative Assembly of Haryana as the BJP candidate from Narnaund. He also lost the contest for the Rohtak Lok Sabha constituency in the same year.

In 2012, as the co–in-charge of BJP Punjab, his role remained pivotal in spearheading the victory of Shiromani Akali Dal-BJP alliance in the Punjab Legislative Assembly elections by beating the anti-incumbency mood in the state.
In 2012, he was involved in Media Management of Uttarakhand Vidhan Sabha elections and the Election Management team of Uttar Pradesh Vidhan Sabha elections.

In 2013, he was appointed as BJP National Spokesperson and Co-in-charge of Uttar Pradesh by Rajnath Singh ahead of the Indian General Election, 2014.

In 2014, he won the Narnaund seat in the Legislative Assembly of Haryana by a margin of 5761 votes. He was then sworn in as a Cabinet Minister. In 2017, he was given also made incharge of BJP part affairs for the state of Punjab. On 26 December 2018, he was again reappointed as the BJP in-charge of the Punjab and Chandigarh.

Ministries
Sindhu was given independent charge of the following 13 Government of Haryana departments as a Cabinet Minister. He had the highest number of departments including

Department of Economic and Statistical Analysis, Haryana, Haryana State Legal Services Authority, Haryana
, Department of Finance, Haryana
, Department of Institutional Finance & Credit Control, Haryana
, Department of Revenue and Disaster Management, Haryana
, Department of Excise & Taxation, Haryana
, Department of Land records & Consolidation, Haryana
, Department of Rehabilitation, Haryana.

Personal life
His mother is Parmeshwari Devi. His father, Mitter Sen Sindhu, was a millionaire industrialist and philanthropist, the owner of A. C. B. India Ltd. The family has been described as a "middle-class Arya Samaj family".

Abhimanyu is in a joint family arrangement with his three sisters and six brothers. He is also involved in the promotion of archery as a sport, serving as president of the Haryana Archery Association and associate vice-president of the Archery Association of India.

Philanthropy

He has inherited a family educational organization called Sindhu Education Foundation. In December 2017, he organized the mass wedding of 51 poor girls in the premises of the Param Mitra Kanya Vidya Niketan Senior Secondary School of Khanda Kheri in Hisar, which he sponsored by donating three years' salary that he had earned in the capacity of minister in the Haryana government.

References

External links
 

1967 births
Indian military personnel
Bharatiya Janata Party politicians from Haryana
21st-century Indian philanthropists
Indian editors
People from Hisar district
People from Rohtak
Living people
2014
State cabinet ministers of Haryana